Alessio di Mauro and Alessandro Motti were the defending champions, but Matteo Baldi and Paolo Lorenzi defeated them in the quarterfinals.

Julian Knowle and Igor Zelenay won the title after defeating Romain Jouan and Benoît Paire in the final, 6–1, 7–6(7–2).

Seeds

Results

Draw

Draw

References
 Main Draw

Orbetello Challenger - Doubles
Orbetello Challenger